Alfred John "AJ" Reynolds is a Canadian performer, entertainer, and radio personality, best known for his internationally syndicated radio show Canada's Top 20 Countdown. Reynolds is also co-founder of Positive Number Productions and is the current host of AJ Reynolds ON Air heard on stations across Canada.

Early life
Born in Sydney, Nova Scotia, Reynolds was raised in Sydney River, Nova Scotia and was born into a family known locally for being radio personalities. Reynolds was the first son in a family of four, consisting of a younger brother and mother and father. Reynolds always had a keen interest in radio and often visited his uncle's morning show on local station CJCB.

Radio career 
Reynolds began his radio career in Moncton, New Brunswick as an afternoon announcer at CKCW-FM. He moved around in time slots and also filled in for news on both K94.5 and its sister station CFQM-FM. After a two-year period Reynolds had quit his position and one day later went to work on air and in production for CJMO-FM and CJXL-FM, where he refined his on-air persona and also developed his production skills. In less than one year he became the overnight host on CFNY-FM. During his three years as host for CFNY he was often the fill-in for Martin Streek.
From 2005 till February 2009, Reynolds left radio to work in feature film. In February 2009, Reynolds restarted his radio career as an announcer at CKHZ-FM, holding number one ratings in the city for his time slot. After a one-year period, Reynolds was moved over to the sister station for the launch of Atlantic Canada's first ever New Rock Station. His position was short lived at CKHY-FM. Reynolds is the current host of Canada's Top 20 Countdown. His introduction to the international entertainment arena began while working with a fellow co-worker and launching the brand Canada's Top 20 Countdown a show now heard on stations coast to coast in Canada, across all Air Canada flights, The Canadian Forces Network and in 20 countries.

Movies and television 
In television, Reynolds has hosted many local programs, from news magazines to national lottery draws. Reynolds worked for over 5 years in feature films behind the scenes, working mainly as an executive producer's assistant and various other positions. Currently Reynolds is in production on his latest television venture which is based upon Canada's Top 20 Countdown.

Further interests 
Outside of his radio career as an announcer, Reynolds is a businessman and entrepreneur. He is the co-founder of Paradise Radio a brand of English radio stations in tourist destinations across the world and he is also the owner of Positive Number Productions, a syndicated program producer and distributor.

References

Canada's Top 20 Countdown: About AJ Reynolds
92.5 The Beat Montreal personalities: AJ Reynolds

External links
 Canada's Top 20 Countdown
 

Canadian DJs
Canadian parodists
People from Sydney, Nova Scotia
Parody musicians
Living people
Year of birth missing (living people)